The 2019 European Parliament election in Portugal elected the Portuguese delegation to the European Parliament from 2019 to 2024. This was the eighth European Parliament election held in Portugal. The election was held on Sunday, 26 May 2019.

The Socialist Party (PS) was the winner of the election, scoring 33.4% of the vote. The party increased their share of the votes by 2% from the 2014 election, and won an additional seat. It was one of the only three times in Portuguese history where the government party won a European election.

The Social Democratic Party (PSD) achieved its worst results ever as a standalone party, with 21.9% of the vote, distancing more than eleven points from the winner. The People's Party (CDS), which ran alongside the PSD in the previous election, as part of the Portugal Alliance, also fell below expectations at 6.2% of the vote, only being able to elect their top candidate Nuno Melo.

The Democratic Unity Coalition (CDU) scored their worst result as well, narrowly electing two European Parliament members compared with their former three. On the other hand, the Left Bloc (BE) rebounded to previous support levels, more than doubling its vote share to 9.8% and electing a new member.

The big surprise of the elections was the result of People-Animals-Nature (PAN). Headed by civil engineer André Silva, PAN won 5.1% of the votes and was able to elect its first ever European Parliament member, over-performing the polls.

Turnout, again, fell to the lowest level ever, with only 30.7% of voters casting a ballot. Abstention reached an unprecedented level of 99.04% for Portuguese citizens living abroad.

Electoral system
The voting method used, for the election of European members of parliament, is by proportional representation using the D'Hondt method. For the 2019 European Union elections, Portugal had 21 seats to fill. Deputies are elected in a single constituency, corresponding to the entire national territory.

This election was also the first in which the changes to the electoral law approved in 2018 were put into practice. The main changes were the automatic registration of all Portuguese citizens, at home and abroad, above 17 year's old, prompting the number of registered voters to increase from 9.7 million to almost 10.8 million, the introduction of early voting to all voters without filling an excuse, in previous elections voters could only vote early if they were unable to attend a polling station on election day, and the end of the "voting card", as voters would only need their identification card to cast a ballot. To vote early, 19,584 voters, 0.2% of all registered voters, requested an early ballot. According to the government, 14,909 voters cast an early ballot.

Parties and candidates 
The major parties that participated in the election and their European Parliament list leaders, ranked by percentage of the vote received, were:

Socialist Party (PS), Pedro Marques
Social Democratic Party (PSD), Paulo Rangel
Left Bloc (BE), Marisa Matias
Democratic Unity Coalition (CDU), João Ferreira
People's Party (CDS), Nuno Melo
People–Animals–Nature (PAN), Francisco Guerreiro
Alliance (A), Paulo Sande
LIVRE (L), Rui Tavares
Basta (B), André Ventura
We, the Citizens! (NC), Paulo de Morais
Liberal Initiative (IL), Ricardo Arroja
Portuguese Workers' Communist Party (PCTP/MRPP), Luís Júdice
National Renovator Party (PNR), João Patrocínio
Democratic Republican Party (PDR), António Marinho e Pinto
United Party of Retirees and Pensioners (PURP), Fernando Loureiro
Portuguese Labour Party (PTP), Gonçalo Madaleno
Socialist Alternative Movement (MAS), Vasco Santos

Campaign period

Party slogans

Candidates' debates

With parties represented in the European Parliament

With parties not represented in the European Parliament

Opinion polls

Graphical summary

Polling

Results

|-
!style="background-color:#E9E9E9" align=left colspan=2|National party
!style="background-color:#E9E9E9" align=left|Europeanparty
!style="background-color:#E9E9E9" align=left|Main candidate
!style="background-color:#E9E9E9" align=right|Votes
!style="background-color:#E9E9E9" align=right|%
!style="background-color:#E9E9E9" align=right|+/–
!style="background-color:#E9E9E9" align=right|Seats
!style="background-color:#E9E9E9" align=right|+/–
|- align="right"
| style="background-color: " width=5px|
| align="left"| Socialist Party (PS)
| align="left"| PES
| align="left"| Pedro Marques
| 1,106,328
| 33.38
| 1.90
! 9
| 1
|- align="right"
| style="background-color: " width=5px|
| align="left"| Social Democratic Party (PSD)
| align="left"| EPP
| align="left"| Paulo Rangel
| 727,224
| 21.94
| 
! 6
| 0
|- align="right"
| style="background-color: " width=5px|
| align="left"| Left Bloc (BE)
| align="left"| PEL / EACL
| align="left"| Marisa Matias
| 325,533
| 9.82
| 5.26
! 2
| 1
|- align="right"
| style="background-color: " width=5px|
| align="left" valign="top" | Unitary Democratic Coalition (CDU) • Communist Party (PCP)• Ecologist Party (PEV)
| align="left" valign="top" | PEL / EGP
| align="left"  valign="top" | João Ferreira
| valign="top" | 228,156
| valign="top" | 6.88
| valign="top" | 5.81
!220
| 10
|- align="right" 
| style="background-color: " width=5px|
| align="left"| CDS - People's Party (CDS-PP)
| align="left"| EPP
| align="left"| Nuno Melo
| 205,106
| 6.19
| 
! 1
| 0
|- align="right"
| style="background-color: teal" width=5px|
| align="left"| People–Animals–Nature (PAN)
| align="left"| APEU / EGP
| align="left"| Francisco Guerreiro
| 168,501
| 5.08
| 3.36
! 1
| 1
|- align="right"
| style="background-color: #6AD1E3;" width=5px|
| align="left"| Alliance (A)
| align="left"| ALDE
| align="left"| Paulo Sande
| 61,753
| 1.86
| new
! 0
| new
|- align="right"
| style="background-color: " width=5px|
| align="left"| LIVRE (L)
| align="left"| DiEM25 / EGP
| align="left"| Rui Tavares
| 60,575
| 1.83
| 0.35
! 0
| 0
|- align="right"
| style="background-color: #202056" width=5px|
| align="left" valign="top" | Basta! (B) • Enough (CH)• People's Monarchist Party (PPM)• Citizenship and Christian Democracy (PPV/CDC)
| align="left" valign="top" | ECPM
| align="left"  valign="top" |  André Ventura
| valign="top" | 49,496
| valign="top" | 1.49
| valign="top" | 0.58
!0000
|new00
|- align="right"
| style="background-color: gold" width=5px|
| align="left"| We, the Citizens! (NC)
| align="left"| ALDE 
| align="left"| Paulo de Morais
| 34,672
| 1.05
| new
! 0
|  1
|- align="right"
| style="background-color: #00ADEF;" width=5px|
| align="left"| Liberal Initiative (IL)
| align="left"| ALDE 
| align="left"| Ricardo Arroja
| 29,120
| 0.88
| new
! 0
| new
|- align="right"
| style="background-color: " width=5px|
| align="left"| Workers' Communist Party (PCTP/MRPP)
| align="left"| None
| align="left"| Luís Júdice
| 27,223
| 0.82
| 0.85
! 0
| 0
|- align="right"
| style="background-color: " width=5px|
| align="left"| National Renovator Party (PNR)
| align="left"| AENM
| align="left"| João Patrocínio
| 16,165
| 0.49
| 0.04
! 0
| 0
|- align="right"
| style="background-color:black" width=5px|
| align="left"| Democratic Republican Party (PDR)
| align="left"| ALDE 
| align="left"| Marinho e Pinto
| 15,790
| 0.48
| new
! 0
|  1
|- align="right"
| style="background:yellow" width=5px|
| align="left"| United Party of Retirees and Pensioners (PURP)
| align="left"| None
| align="left"| Fernando Loureiro
| 13,582
| 0.41
| new
! 0
| new 
|- align="right"
| style="background:#CC0033;" width=5px|
| align="left"| Portuguese Labour Party (PTP)
| align="left"| None
| align="left"| Gonçalo Madaleno 
| 8,640
| 0.26
| 0.43
! 0
| 0
|- align="right"
| style="background:crimson;" width=5px|
| align="left"| Socialist Alternative Movement (MAS)
| align="left"| None
| align="left"| Vasco Santos
| 6,641
| 0.20
| 0.18
! 0
| 0
|- style="background-color:#E9E9E9"
| style="text-align:right;" colspan="4" | Valid votes
| 3,084,505
| 93.06
| colspan="3" rowspan="2" | 
|- style="background-color:#E9E9E9"
| style="text-align:right;" colspan="4" | Blank and invalid votes
| 229,909
| 6.93
|- style="background-color:#E9E9E9"
| style="text-align:right;" colspan="4" | Totals
| 3,314,414
| 100.00| —! style="background-color:#E9E9E9"| 21
| 0 '''
|- style="background-color:#E9E9E9"
| colspan="4" | Eligible voters / turnout
| 10,786,068
| 30.73
| 2.94
| colspan="2"| 
|-
| align="left" colspan="11"| Source: Europeias 2019, Comissão Nacional de Eleições 
|}

Distribution by European group

Maps

Electorate

See also
2019 European Parliament election
Politics of Portugal
List of political parties in Portugal

Notes

References

External links 
 Official results site, Portuguese Ministry of Internal Administration
 Portuguese Electoral Commission
 ERC – Official publication of polls

Portugal
2019
2019 elections in Portugal